William H. Peterson served as a member of the 1865-1867 California State Assembly, representing the 2nd District.

References

Year of birth missing
Place of birth missing
Year of death missing
Place of death missing
Members of the California State Assembly